Michael Mehigan (12 September 1886 – 20 December 1955) was an Irish Gaelic footballer and a Sinn Féin politician during the Irish Revolution.

Sporting career

Mehigan played as a left wing-back for the Cork senior team. He made his first appearance for the team during the 1906 championship and was a regular member of the starting fifteen over the next decade. During that time he won one All-Ireland medal and three Munster medals. In 1911 Mehigan captained the team to the All-Ireland title.

At club level Mehigan was a multiple county championship medalist with Lees. He began his club career with Clonakilty.

Mehigan hailed from a family with a strong association with Gaelic games. His younger brother, Denis, followed him onto the Cork football team. His elder brother, Paddy, played both hurling and football for Cork and London and was later a pioneering Gaelic games journalist. A great grand-nephew, Owen Sexton, played for Cork in the 2000s.

Political activity

Mehigan was active in Sinn Féin from 1917. In 1920 he was arrested and sent to Wormwood Scrubs prison where, with others, he was involved in a hunger strike in April/May.
In June 1920, back in Cork, he acted as returning officer during the local elections in the county. He became chairman of the Cork Rural District Council in 1921.

After the Anglo-Irish Treaty he took the pro-Treaty side but did not engage in the Civil War. In the 1922 general election he toured the polling booths in the Clonakilty district with Michael Collins.

After the Civil War he moved to Dublin and worked in the civil service.

References

 

1886 births
1955 deaths
Clonakilty Gaelic footballers
Lees Gaelic footballers
Cork inter-county Gaelic footballers
Winners of one All-Ireland medal (Gaelic football)